The corkwing wrasse (Symphodus melops) is a species of wrasse native to the eastern Atlantic Ocean from Norway to Morocco and out to the Azores, as well as being found in the Mediterranean Sea and the Adriatic Sea.

Description

Its body is deep and compressed sideways, with a single, long dorsal fin.

It is highly variable in colour, depending on the environment and age of the fish. The corkwing wrasse has a black spot in the middle of the tail stalk, and a comma-shaped spot behind the eye. Females and juveniles tend to be brown or greenish-brown, while the males are typically more brightly coloured. Both sexes have lines on their heads and gill covers which are brown and pale blue in the female, and bright green or blue in the male.

It feeds on a large variety of prey, but mainly bivalves and copepods.

Reproduction
The males exhibit dimorphism, where the territorial males build a ball-shaped nest of seaweed in rock crevices or sedimentary areas, amongst seaweed or seagrasses. The nest has an entrance hole which the male guards aggressively. The other morph mimics the females and tries to sneak-fertilize. The sneakers are much smaller than the territorial males, and cannot be visually distinguished from females. As there is a trade-off between reproductive investment and growth, the sneakers have much larger gonads related to body size than the territorial males. Their sperm quality is also shown to be better for the sneaker, as it is longer-lived.  About 5 – 20% of the males in a population tend to be sneakers.

Importance
The fish has been commercially used since 1988 because of its ability to remove parasites from other fish. It is today heavily fished and one may say exploited for the use in aquaculture to remove salmon louse (Lepeophtheirus salmonis).

References

 Deady, S., Varian, S. J. A. and Fives, J. M. (1995) The use of cleaner-fish to control sea lice on two Irish salmon (Salmo salar) farms with particular reference to wrasse behaviour in salmon cages. Aquaculture. 131: 73-90.
 Potts, G.W. (1973) Cleaning symbiosis among British fish with special reference to Crenilabrus melops (Labridae). J. mar. biol. asso. UK. 53: 1-10.
 Potts, G.W. (1985) The nest structure of the corkwing wrasse, Crenilabrus melops (Labridae: Teleostei). J. mar. biol. ass. UK. 65: 531-546.
 Sayer, M. D. J., Gibson, R. N. and Atkinson, R. J. A. (1996) Growth, diet and condition of the corkwing wrasse and rock cook on the west coast of Scotland. J. Fish. Biol. 49(1): 76-94.
 Uglem, I., Rosenqvist, G. and Wasslavik, H. S. (2000) Phenotypic variation between dimorphic males in corkwing wrasse. J. Fish. Biol. 57: 1-14.
 Uglem, I., Mayer, I. and Rosenqvist, G. (2002) Variation in Plasma Steroids and Reproductive Traits in Dimorphic Males of Corkwing Wrasse (Symphodus melops L.). Hormones and behavior. 41(4): 396-404.
 Uglem, I. & Rosenqvist, G. (2002) Nest Building and Mating in Relation to Male Size in Corkwing Wrasse, Symphodus Melops. Environmental Biology of Fishes. 63(1): 17-25.

External links
 

corkwing wrasse
Fauna of the Azores
Fish of the North Sea
corkwing wrasse
Taxa named by Carl Linnaeus